Blonde Savage is a 1947 American adventure film directed by Steve Sekely and written by Gordon Bache. The film stars Leif Erickson, Gale Sherwood, Veda Ann Borg, Douglass Dumbrille, Frank Jenks, and Matt Willis. It was released on November 22, 1947 by Producers Releasing Corporation.

Plot
Explorers Steve Blake and Hoppy Owens are hired to lead an expedition into the deep jungle. Their first day of exploration uncovers a native tribe led by a tall white blonde woman who was raised by the tribe after her parents were mysteriously killed years earlier.

Cast      
Leif Erickson as Steve Blake
Gale Sherwood as Meelah
Veda Ann Borg as Connie Harper
Douglass Dumbrille as Mark Harper
Frank Jenks as Hoppy Owens
Matt Willis as Berger
Ernest Whitman as Tonga
Cay Forester as Mary Comstock
John Dehner as Joe Comstock
Art Foster as Stone 
Alex Frazer as George Bennett 
Eve Whitney as Clarissa
James Logan as Inspector

Gallery

References

External links

 
 

1947 films
American adventure films
1947 adventure films
Producers Releasing Corporation films
Films directed by Steve Sekely
American black-and-white films
1940s English-language films
1940s American films